Cetaphil  or  is a line of skin care products from the Swiss company Galderma, including cleansers, bar soap, cream, lotion, and moisturizers. It was developed in 1947, in Texas, by an American pharmacist. Cetaphil products are available worldwide in more than 70 countries, commonly sold at grocery stores and pharmacies throughout the United States, Canada and India. They are also available in pharmacies in 
Australia, Hong Kong, South Korea, Indonesia, the Philippines, South Africa, Singapore, some European, Latin American and Caribbean countries.

The brand makes products for people with sensitive, dry and/or acne-prone skin as an alternative to harsher types of soap. The website claims all Cetaphil products work without creating five challenges: irritation, roughness, weakened skin barrier, tightness and dryness.

Cetaphil is highly used and known for its line of scent-free lotion and moisturizers. It is oil-free and historically has been known to be safe for most types of skin because of its simplicity and non-harsh chemical build up, even though the use of parabens remains controversial.  New ingredients were added in 2021, however, and there may therefore be less evidence base regarding the "harshness" of these ingredients for those with the most sensitive skin.  

Prior to a change in formulation, Cetaphil cleanser ingredients were: water, cetyl alcohol, propylene glycol, sodium lauryl sulfate, stearyl alcohol, methylparaben, propylparaben, butylparaben.  However, in 2021 Cetaphil changed its formula, adding several new ingredients including niacinimide, panthenol, and glycerin.

External links
 Cetaphil US website

Notes

Personal care brands
Acne treatments